Ever since the British left India in 1947, many streets, places and buildings throughout India were assigned new "Indian names".  Tamil Nadu was no exception to this trend.

Even the state and its capital, Chennai along with many other cities, towns, streets and organisations were renamed post Indian Independence.  Before the name changes, Madras (the city) used to be the capital of the much larger Madras (the state).

Geography

State 
 Madras Presidency was renamed Madras (State) after independence in 1947.
 Madras (State) was renamed Tamil Nadu in 1969.

Districts 
 Chidambaranar district was renamed Thoothukudi district in 1997
 Dr. Ambedkar Vellore district was renamed Vellore district in 1997
 Thiruvannamalai Sambuvarayer district was renamed to Thiruvannamalai district in 1997
 Villupuram Ramasamy Padayatchiyar District was renamed to Villupuram district in 1997

Cities 
 Madras, the capital of Tamil Nadu (formerly Madras State) was renamed Chennai in 1996.
 Trichy/Trichinopoly renamed to Thiruchirapalli
 Tuticorin, sea gateway of Tamil Nadu was renamed Thoothukudi

Towns and municipalities 
 Thirupattur renamed as Tirupathur.
 Thiruvaikundam from Srivaikuntam
 Tiruvannamalai from Trinomali/Trimomalee
 Tiruchengode from Trichengode
 Kanyakumari from Cape Comorin
 Tharangampadi from Tranquebar
 Thanjavur from Tanjore
 Kumbakonam from Kudanthai
 Mayiladuthurai from Mayavaram, Mayuram
 Udagamandalam/Udagai from Ootacamund or Ooty
Ramanathapuram from Ramnad
Parangipettai from Porto novo
 Thirunelveli/Nellai from Tinnevelly
 Sathurangapattinam from Sadras
 Thiruvallur – Trivellore
 Kollidam – Coleroon, distributary of River Kaveri
 Magudanchaavadi – McDonald's Choultry (Salem District)
 Kodiakkarai – Point Calimere 
 Kalambur – Aliyabadh
 Negapatnam to Nagapattinam
 Wandiwash to Vandavasi
 Gingee to Senji
 Conjeevaram to Kanchipuram

Neighbourhoods 
 Egmore to Ezhumbur 
 Triplicane to Thiruvallikeni 
 Mylapore to Mayilapoor 
 Purasawalkam to Purasaivakkam
 Aminjikarai to Amainthakarai 
 Poonamallee to Poovirunthavalli 
 Kilpauk to Keezhpaakkam 
 Kellys to Killiyoor
Perambur to Peramboor
 Ayanavaram to Ayanpuram

Bridges 
 Gemini Flyover in Chennai to Anna Flyover after C. N. Annadurai
 Pamban Road Bridge in Rameswaram to Annai Indira Gandhi Road Bridge after Indira Gandhi
 Porur Flyover in Chennai to Bharat Ratna Puratchi Thalaivar Dr. M.G.R. Flyover after M. G. Ramachandran
 Two-tier Flyover in Salem to Puratchi Thalaivi J. Jayalalithaa Two-tier Flyover after J. Jayalalithaa

Roads 
 Brough Road in Erode to Meenakshi Sundaranar Salai after Meenakshi Sundaranar
 Chamiers Road in Chennai to Pasumpon Muthuramalinga Thevar Salai after U. Muthuramalingam Thevar
 Commander-In-Chief Road in Chennai to Ethiraj Salai after V. L. Ethiraj
 East Coast Road in Chennai to Muthamizh Arignar Kalaignar Karunanidhi Salai after M. Karunanidhi
 Edward Elliot Road in Chennai to Dr. Radhakrishnan Salai after Sarvepalli Radhakrishnan
 Elliot's Beach Road in Chennai to Sardar Patel Salai after Sardar Vallabhbhai Patel
 Ettayapuram Road in Thoothukudi to Kamarajar Salai after K. Kamaraj
 Frazer Bridge Road in Chennai to TNPSC Salai after TNPSC
 Gandhi Nagar 4th Main Road in Chennai to B. Ramachandra Adithanar Salai after B. Ramachandra Adityan
 Gokula Kannan Road in Tirunelveli to Dr. M.G.R. Salai after M. G. Ramachandran
 Griffith Road in Chennai to Maharajapuram Santhanam Salai after Maharajapuram Santhanam
 Halls Road in Chennai to Tamil Salai after Tamil language
 Harris Road in Chennai to Adithanar Salai after S. P. Adithanar
 Inner Ring Road in Chennai to Jawaharlal Nehru Salai after Jawaharlal Nehru
 Lattice Bridge Road in Chennai to Dr. Muthulakshmi Salai after Dr. Muthulakshmi Reddi
 Lloyds Road in Chennai to Avvai Shanmugam Salai after T. K. Shanmugam
 Marina Beach Road in Chennai to Kamarajar Salai after K. Kamaraj
 Marshall's Road in Chennai to Rukmini Lakshmipathi Salai after Rukmini Lakshmipathi
 Montieth Road in Chennai to Red Cross Road after Red Cross Movement
 Mount Road in Chennai to Anna Salai after C. N. Annadurai
 Mount-Poonamallee-Avadi Road in Chennai to Puratchi Thalaivar Dr. M.G.R. Nedunchalai after M. G. Ramachandran
 Mowbray's Road in Chennai to T.T.K. Salai after T. T. Krishnamachari
 North Beach Road in Chennai to Rajaji Salai after C. Rajagopalachari
 Nungambakkam Highway in Chennai to Mahatma Gandhi Salai after Mahatma Gandhi
 Old Mamallapuram Road in Chennai to Rajiv Gandhi Salai after Rajiv Gandhi
 Oliver Road in Chennai to Musiri Subramaniam Salai after Musiri Subramania Iyer
 Omalur Main Road in Salem to M.G.R. Salai after M. G. Ramachandran
 Padmavathi Nagar Main Road in Chennai to Chinna Kalaivanar Vivek Salai after Vivek
 Palayamkottai Road in Thoothukudi to Tamizh Salai after Tamil language
 Perumbakkam Main Road in Chennai to Semmozhi Salai after Classical language
 Ponamallee Highway in Chennai to Periyar E.V.R. Salai after E. V. Ramasami
 Port Highway in Thoothukudi to V.O.C. Salai after V. O. Chidambaram Pillai
 Pycrofts Road in Chennai to Bharathi Salai after Subramania Bharati
 Royapettah Highway in Chennai to Thiru. Vi.Ka. Salai after Thiru. V. Kalyanasundaram
 Sampath Nagar Road in Erode to Tyagi Kumaran Salai, Sampath Nagar after Tirupur Kumaran
 Sholinganallur Main Road in Chennai to Kalaignar Karunanidhi Salai after M. Karunanidhi
 Simmakkal Road in Madurai to V.O. Chidambaranar Salai after V. O. Chidambaram Pillai
 South Boag Road in Chennai to Chevalier Sivaji Ganesan Salai after Sivaji Ganesan
 Tiruchendur Road in Thoothukudi to Tiruchenthilandavar Salai after Senthil Andavar
 Warren Road in Chennai to Bhakthavatsalam Salai after M. Bhakthavatsalam
 West Great Cotton Road (W.G.C. Road) in Thoothukudi to V.O. Chidambaranar Salai (V.O.C. Salai) after V. O. Chidambaram Pillai
 Wall Tax Road in Chennai to V.O.C. Salai after V. O. Chidambaram Pillai
 Whannels Road in Chennai to Annai. E.V.R. Maniammaiyar Salai after E. V. R. Maniammai

Region 
 Coromandal Coast renamed to Chozhamandalam coast

Seaport 
 Ennore Port to Kamarajar Port Limited
 Thoothukkudi Port Trust to V.O. Chidambaranar Port Authority

Airport 
 Terminal 1 in Chennai International Airport to Kamaraj Terminal
 Terminal 3 in Chennai International Airport to Anna Terminal

Railway Station 
 Chennai Central Railway Station to Puratchi Thalaivar Dr. M.G. Ramachandran Central Railway Station
 Maniyachchi Junction Railway Station to Vanchi Maniyachchi Junction Railway Station
 Maraimalai Nagar Railway Station to Maraimalai Nagar Kamarajar Railway Station
 Vyasarpadi Railway Station to Vyasarpadi Jeeva Railway Station

Metro Station 
 Alandur Metro to Arignar Anna Alandur Metro
 Chennai Central Metro to Puratchi Thalaivar Dr. M.G. Ramachandran Central Metro
 Chennai Mofussil Bus Terminus Metro to Puratchi Thalaivi Dr. J. Jayalalithaa CMBT Metro

Bus Terminus 
 Alangulam Bus Stand to Perunthalaivar Kamarajar Memorial Bus Stand
 Anjugramam Bus Stand to Dr. M.G.R. Bus Stand
 Attur Bus Stand to Perunthalaivar Kamarajar Bus Stand
 Chengalpattu Bus Stand to Perarignar Anna Bus Stand
 Chennai Mofussil Bus Terminus to Puratchi Thalaivar Dr. M.G.R. Bus Terminus
 Chinnasalem Bus Stand to Perunthalaivar Kamaraj Bus Stand
 Dharmapuri Bus Stand to P.R. Rajagopal Gounder Bus Stand
 Dindigul Bus Stand to Kamarajar Bus Stand
 Erode Central Bus Stand to Independence day Silver Jubilee Bus Terminus
 Ettayapuram Bus Stand to Mahakavi Bharathiyar Bus Stand
 Hosur Bus Stand to K. Appavu Pillai Bus Stand
 Kallakurichi Bus Stand to Perarignar Dr. Anna Bus Stand
 Kancheepuram Bus Stand to Perarignar Anna Bus Stand
 Kanniyakumari Bus Stand to Kavimani Desigavinayagam Bus Stand
 Kovilpatti Old Bus Stand to Arignar Anna Bus Stand
 Krishnagiri Bus Stand to Perarignar Anna Bus Stand
 Mattuthavani Integrated Bus Terminus to M.G.R. Bus Stand
 Madurai Central Bus Stand to Periyar Bus Stand
 Mayiladuthurai Bus Stand to Perunthalaivar Kamarajar Bus Stand
 Rajapalayam Bus Stand to Gandhiji Centenary Memorial Bus Stand
 Salem Central Bus Stand to Bharat Ratna Dr. M.G.R. Central Bus Stand
 Sattur Bus Stand to Anna Coral Jubilee Bus Stand
 Sivakasi Bus Stand to N.R.K. Rajarathnam Bus Stand
 Thanjavur Old Bus Stand to Ayyasamy Vandayar Memorial Bus Stand
 Theni Bus Stand to Colonel John Penny Cuick Bus Stand
 Thisayanvilai Bus Stand to Perunthalaivar Kamarajar Bus Stand
 Thoothukkudi Central Bus Stand to Perarignar Anna Bus Terminus
 Tiruchendur Bus Stand to Thyagi Bhagat Singh Bus Stand
 Tirunelveli New Bus Stand to Bharat Ratna Dr. M.G.R. Bus Stand
 Tirunelveli Junction Bus Stand to Tirunelveli Junction Periyar Bus Stand
 Usilampatti Bus Stand to Pasumpon U. Muthuramalinga Thevar Memorial Bus Stand
 Vilathikulam Bus Stand to Bharathiyar Bus Stand
 Virudhunagar New Bus Stand to Karmaveerar Kamarajar Bus Stand
 Virudhunagar Old Bus Stand to M.S.P. Nadar Bus Stand

Transport 
The Tamil Nadu state owned transport corporations operated buses to facilitate public transport in the state and interstate connectivity through roads. It named various corporations by prominent personalities/kings of regional/national importance. However the practice was scrapped and it started naming the corporations as TNSTC – Regional Division (Ex TNSTC Villupuram Division) after communal violence broke in the district of Virudhunagar during May 1997 after formation of Veeran Sundaralingam Transport corporation in which buses bearing the name Veeran Sundaralingam were burnt by some groups.
 Pallavan Transport Corporation (PTC) & Dr. Ambedkar Transport Corporation (DATC) to Metropolitan Transport Corporation (MTC) (TN-01/02)
 Thiruvalluvar Transport Corporation (TTC) & Rajiv Gandhi Transport Corporation (RGTC) to State Express Transport Corporation (SETC) (TN-01/07)
 Thanthai Periyar Transport Corporation (TPTC) to TNSTC Villupuram DIV I (TN-32)
 Pattukottai Azhagiri Transport Corporation (PATC) to TNSTC Villupuram DIV II (Vellore) (TN-23)
 Puratchi Thalaivar M.G.R. Transport Corporation (PTMGRTC) to TNSTC Villupuram DIV III (Kanchipuram) (TN-21)
 Chozhan Transport Corporation to TNSTC Kumbakonam DIV I (TN-49 then TN-68)
 Deeran Chinnamalai Transport Corporation (DCTC) to TNSTC Kumbakonam DIV II (Trichy) (TN-45)
 Marudu Pandiyar Transport Corporation to TNSTC Kumbakonam DIV III (Karaikudi) (TN-63)
 Veeran Azhagu Muthukon Transport Corporation to TNSTC Kumbakonam DIV IV (Pudukkotai) (TN-55)
 Anna Transport Corporation to TNSTC Salem DIV I (TN-27)
 Annai Sathya Transport Corporation to TNSTC Salem DIV II (Dharmapuri) (TN-29)
 Cheran Transport Corporation to TNSTC Coimbatore DIV I(TN-37 then TN-38)
 Jeeva Transport Corporation to TNSTC Coimbatore DIV II (Erode) (TN-33)
 Bharathiyar Transport Corporation to TNSTC Coimbatore DIV III Ooty then merged to TNSTC Coimbatore DIV I(TN-43)
 Pandiyan Transport Corporation to TNSTC Madurai DIV I (TN-59 then TN-58)
 Kattabomman Transport Corporation to TNSTC Madurai DIV II (Tirunelveli) (TN-72)
 Nesamany Transport Corporation to TNSTC Madurai DIV III (Nagercoil) (TN-74)
 Rani Mangamma Transport Corporation to TNSTC Madurai DIV IV (Dindigul) (TN-57)
 Veeran Sundaralingam Transport Corporation to TNSTC Madurai DIV V (Virudhunagar) (TN-67)

Infrastructure 
 Chepauk Stadium or MCC (Madras Cricket Club) ground to M.A. Chidambaram Stadium
Srinivasa Mudaliar Park to VOC Park, Erode.

References 

Tamil Nadu-related lists